The grass carp (Ctenopharyngodon idella) is a species of large herbivorous freshwater fish in the family Cyprinidae, native to the Pacific Far East, with a native range stretching from northern Vietnam to the Amur River on the Sino-Russian border. This Asian carp is the only species of the genus Ctenopharyngodon.

It is cultivated as a food fish in China for centuries being known as one of the Four Domestic Fish (四大家鱼), but was later introduced to Europe and the United States for aquatic weed control, becoming the fish species with the largest reported farmed production globally, over five million tonnes per year.

Appearance and anatomy
Grass carp have elongated, chubby, torpedo-shaped body forms. The terminal mouth is slightly oblique with non-fleshy, firm lips, and no barbels. The complete lateral line contains 40 to 42 scales. Broad, ridged pharyngeal teeth are arranged in a "2, 4-4, 2" formula. The dorsal fin has eight to 10 soft rays, and the anal fin is set closer to the tail than most cyprinids. Body color is dark olive, shading to brownish-yellow on the sides, with a white belly and large, slightly outlined scales. 
 
Grass carp grow very rapidly.

Ecology
Grass carp inhabit lakes, ponds, pools and backwaters of large rivers, preferring large, slow-flowing or standing water bodies with abundant vegetation. In the wild, grass carp spawn in fast-moving rivers, and their eggs, which are slightly heavier than water, develop while drifting downstream, kept in suspension by turbulence. Grass carp require long rivers for the survival of the eggs and very young fish, and the eggs are thought to die if they sink to the bottom.

Adults grass carp feed primarily on aquatic plants, both higher aquatic plants and submerged terrestrial vegetation, but may also eat detritus, insects and other invertebrates. They eat up to three times their own body weight daily, and thrive in small lakes and backwaters that provide an abundant supply of vegetation.

According to one study, grass carp live 5-9 years, with the oldest surviving 11 years. In Silver Lake, Washington, a thriving population of grass carp is passing the 15-year mark.

Introduced species
Grass carp have been introduced to many countries around the world. In the Northern Hemisphere, countries and territories of introduction include Japan, the Philippines, Malaysia, India, Pakistan, Iran, Israel, the United States, Mexico, Sweden, Denmark, the United Kingdom, France, Germany, the Netherlands, Switzerland, Italy, Poland, the Czech Republic, Slovakia, Romania, Croatia, Slovenia, Serbia, Montenegro, Bosnia and Herzegovina and Macedonia. In the Southern Hemisphere, they have been introduced to Argentina, Venezuela, Australia, New Zealand, Fiji and South Africa. Grass carp are known to have spawned and established self-reproducing populations in only six of the many larger Northern Hemisphere rivers into which they have been stocked. Their failure to establish populations in other rivers suggests they have quite specific reproductive requirements.

In the United States, the species was first imported in 1963 from Taiwan and Malaysia to aquaculture facilities in Alabama and Arkansas. The first release is believed to have been an accidental escape in 1966 from the U.S. Fish and Wildlife Service's Fish Farming Experimental Station in Stuttgart, Arkansas, followed by planned introductions beginning in 1969. Subsequently, authorized, illegal and accidental introductions have been widespread; by the 1970s, the species had been introduced to 40 states, and it has since been reported in 45 of the country's 50 states. In 2013, it was determined to be reproducing in the Great Lakes Basin. It is still stocked in many states as an effective biocontrol for undesirable aquatic vegetation, many species of which are themselves introduced.

Use

Weed control
Grass carp were introduced into New Zealand in 1966 to control the growth of aquatic plants. Unlike the other introduced fish brought to New Zealand, the potential value and impact of grass carp was investigated in secure facilities prior to their use in field trials. They are now approved by the New Zealand government for aquatic weed control, although each instance requires specific authorization. In the Netherlands, the species was also introduced in 1973 to control over-abundant aquatic weeds. The release was controlled and regulated by the Dutch Ministry of Agriculture, Nature, and Food Quality. In both of these countries, control is made easier because grass carp are very unlikely to naturally reproduce because of their very specific breeding requirements, but elsewhere, control is obtained by the use of sterile, triploid fish.

Food
Grass carp is one of the most common freshwater farmed fish in China, being one of the Four Domestic Fish (四大家鱼). Its meat is tender, while with little bone. Many Chinese cuisine has grass carp as a featured dish, such as Cantonese cuisine.

Fishing for grass carp

Grass carp grow large and are strong fighters when hooked on a line, but because of their vegetarian habits and their wariness, they can be difficult to catch via angling. The fish are also popular sport fish in areas where bowfishing is legal.

Where grass carp populations are maintained through stocking as a biocontrol for noxious weeds, fishermen are typically asked to return any caught to the water alive and unharmed.

References

External links

 Species Profile - Grass Carp (Ctenopharyngodon idella), National Invasive Species Information Center, United States National Agricultural Library. Lists general information and resources for Grass Carp.

 

grass carp
Commercial fish
Freshwater fish of China
Fish of East Asia
Herbivorous vertebrates
Taxa named by Achille Valenciennes
grass carp
Squaliobarbinae
Chinese seafood dishes